The American Nurses Association Hall of Fame  or the ANA Hall of Fame is an award which recognizes the historical contributions to nursing in the United States.

History
In 1974, in preparation for the United States Bicentennial, the American Nurses Association (ANA) created a seven-member committee to recognize the dedication and achievements of professional nurses in a Hall of Fame. Fifteen inaugural women were selected as inductees and the committee recommended that the nomination process and inductions become a permanent vehicle for recognition. In 1982, National Nurse's Day was proclaimed by President Ronald Reagan to be celebrated on May 6 and in conjunction with the celebration, the ANA at their annual convention, inducted six more nurses. The ANA board approved periodic addition of members thereafter, inducting new members in 1984, 1986, and 1996. In 1996, the criteria changed so that inductees did not have to be deceased and that inductions occur biennially.

Criteria
The criteria for induction include that the nominees must be leaders in health, social or political policy which have had a sustaining impact on nursing in the United States. All candidates, unless they were working prior to 1873, must have completed a formal registered nursing program. Contributions to the field could have occurred locally or internationally, but must demonstrate their enduring value beyond the honoree's lifetime. Since 1996, inductees may be living or deceased.

Inductees

References

External links

Hall of Fame
Lists of health professionals
Halls of fame in Maryland
Organizations established in 1974
1974 establishments in the United States